Starfighter, star fighter or starfighters may refer to:

Film
 The Last Starfighter, a 1984 science fiction film
 The Starfighters, a 1964 film about F-104 pilots
, a 2015 German film about the investigation of F-104's accidents in mid 1960s in West Germany

Video games
Starfighter (video game), 1979
Star Fighter (video game), 1994
 Star Wars: Starfighter, 2001
 Project: Starfighter, a 2001 open Source 2D shoot 'em up

Vehicles and transportation
 Lockheed F-104 Starfighter, a combat aircraft of the U.S. Air Force
 Canadair CF-104 Starfighter, a variant of the Lockheed F-104
 Starfighters Inc, a civilian organization that flies F-104 Starfighters
 VF-33 "Starfighters", a disestablished US Navy fighter squadron

Fictional
 A fighter spacecraft in science fiction
 List of Star Wars starfighters
 X-wing starfighter

Other uses
 Starfighters (band), a musical group
 Sailor Star Fighter, a character in Sailor Moon

See also

 
 
 Fighter (disambiguation)
 Star (disambiguation)